Dorothy Good (historically referred to as Dorcas Good; ca. 1687/1688 – ?) was the daughter of William Good and Sarah Good (née Solart). Dorothy and her mother Sarah were accused of practicing witchcraft in Salem at the beginning of the Salem witch trials in 1692. Only four years old at the time, she was interrogated by the local magistrates, confessed to being a witch and purportedly claimed she had seen her mother consorting with the devil. Mary Walcott and Ann Putnam Jr. claimed the child was deranged and repeatedly bit them as if she were an animal.

Dorothy, written as "Dorcas" on the warrant for her arrest, received a brief hearing in which the accusers repeatedly complained of bites on their arms. She was sent to jail, becoming at age five the youngest person to be jailed during the Salem witch trials. Two days later, she was visited by Salem officials. She claimed she owned a snake given to her by her mother that talked to her and sucked blood from her finger. The officials took this to mean it was her "familiar", which is defined as a witch's spiritual servant in animal form.

Dorothy was in custody from March 24, 1692, when she was arrested until she was released on bond for £50 on December 10, 1692. She was never indicted or tried. Her examinations by the magistrates were conducted on March 24, 25, and 26th, according to Rev. Deodat Lawson:The Magistrates and Ministers also did informe me, that they apprehended a child of Sarah G. and Examined it, being between 4 and 5 years of Age And as to matter of Fact, they did Unanimously affirm, that when this Child, did but cast its eye upon the afflicted persons, they were tormented, and they held her Head, and yet so many as her eye could fix upon were afflicted. Which they did several times make careful observation of: the afflicted complained, they had often been Bitten by this child, and produced the marks of a small set of teeth, accordingly, this was also committed to Salem Prison; the child looked hail, and well as other Children. I saw it at Lievt. Ingersols After the commitment of Goode. N. Tho: Putmans wife was much better, and had no violent fits at all from that 24th of March to the 5th of April. Some others also said they had not seen her so frequently appear to them, to hurt them. ... On the 26th of March, Mr. Hathorne, Mr. Corwin, and Mr. Higison were at the Prison-Keepers house to examine the Child. The child told them there, it had a little Snake that used to Suck on the lowest Joint of  her Fore-Finger. When they inquired where, pointing to other places, The child told them, not there, but there, pointing on the Lowest point of the Fore-Finger; where they observed a deep Red Spot, about the Bigness of a Flea-bite.

Dorothy had a younger sister, Mercy, who was born after Sarah Good's arrest and died shortly after birth, likely from malnourishment and the harsh conditions of imprisonment.

"Dorothy" v. "Dorcas"
Good's first name was incorrectly written as "Dorcas" by Magistrate John Hathorne on the warrant for her arrest dated March 23, 1692, but was correctly called "Dorothy" everywhere else in the legal records. Deodat Lawson's accounts of her examinations never mention her first name, but later writers, such as Charles W. Upham in his influential  book Salem Witchcraft (1867), repeated the initial error from the arrest warrant and she has subsequently come to be referred to by the wrong name.

Fictional portrayals
Earhart, Rose. Dorcas Good: The Diary of a Salem Witch. Pendleton Books, NY, 2000; 
Kent, Kathleen. "The Heretic's Daughter". Little, Brown and Company, NY, 2008; 
Rinaldi, Ann. A Break with Charity. Simon and Schuster Books, NY, 1992;

References

1680s births
Place of death missing
Year of death missing
American children
Colonial American women
People accused of witchcraft
People of the Salem witch trials